"I Wish I Was Queer So I Could Get Chicks" is the second single from American rap rock band Bloodhound Gang's second studio album, One Fierce Beer Coaster (1996). Released as a single in 1997, the song charted in New Zealand, reaching number 32 that October. An alternate version was recorded as a B-side, featuring a crooning vocal over Nashville country/lounge backing.

Content
The satirical song is entirely about the belief that girls only like gay men. The lyrics reference the stereotype that gay men are often better looking and more sensitive than heterosexual men, enjoy the band Depeche Mode and avant garde ballet, and how Jimmy Pop, the band's singer, wishes that he could be a homosexual to be more successful with women.

Reception
Writing in The Advocate (a leading US magazine for gay readers), Barry Walters described the song as "annoying" but admitted the band's stereotypes of homosexuals were somewhat accurate, "especially the Depeche Mode part".

Music video
The music video starts out with Jimmy Pop, who is playing a gay talk-show host named Dirk Ramrod, and his co-host, Lewis, who is played by bassist Evil Jared Hasselhoff discussing their special guest for the day, Lupus Thunder and DJ Q-Ball from Bloodhound Gang. The video then becomes a montage of some of Dirk and Lewis's (Jimmy and Jared's) favorite (nastiest) moments off the show, leaving DJ Q-Ball and Lupus disgusted and slightly amused until the video ends with Jimmy Pop and Evil Jared saying, "Come again, if ya got the balls!"

Charts

References

Bloodhound Gang songs
1997 singles
1996 songs
LGBT-related songs
Songs written by Jimmy Pop